Sheikh Khalifa Medical City, managed by SEHA, serves as the flagship institution for Abu Dhabi Health Services Company (SEHA). It is governed by its commitment to practice modern medicine to the same high standards as the best medical facilities in the world. SKMC’s comprehensive health care services cater to the needs and priorities of the Abu Dhabi community, ensuring not only optimal levels of patient care and satisfaction but also promoting general health and well-being through education and awareness.

Sheikh Khalifa Medical City consists of a 586-bed acute care hospital, 14 outpatient specialty clinics and a blood bank, all accredited by Joint Commission International (JCI). Additionally, SKMC manages a 125-bed Behavioral Sciences Pavilion (BSP), and an Urgent Care Center located within the city of Abu Dhabi.

History
Sheikh Khalifa Medical City was created in 2005 as a result of the merger of all publicly held healthcare organizations in Abu Dhabi island. The merged entities were:
 Abu Dhabi Central Hospital - built in the late 1960s and the oldest hospital in Abu Dhabi, it served as a 200-bed hospital until it was scaled down in 2003 to an emergency center and an outpatient dialysis unit
 Abu Dhabi Psychiatric Hospital -a 120-bed facility
 Abu Dhabi Rehabilitation Center - an 88-bed facility that was serving mainly as a nursing home for the elderly and people with special needs
 Al Jazeera Hospital - built in the 1970s, a 300-bed acute care medical facility which was open for expatriates who lived on Abu Dhabi island only
 Preventive Medicine Clinic
 Primary Healthcare Clinics - nine clinics dispersed across the island
 Sheikh Khalifa Medical Center - commissioned in 2000, it is a 250-bed acute care medical facility which was open only for UAE nationals

The new healthcare conglomerate adopted the brand of the newest facility, “Sheikh Khalifa Medical Center”, and changed the name from Center to City, to reflect the true nature of the new organization. Following the merger, SKMC underwent a series of transformational events to strengthen the merger.

In 2007, SKMC came under the management of Cleveland Clinic, which is heralded as one of the top hospitals in the United States, according to U.S. News & World Report. The following year, SKMC received Joint Commission International accreditation for its Main Hospital (Surgical and Medical Pavilions), Outpatient Specialty Clinics, Khalidiya Urgent Care Center and Abu Dhabi Blood Bank. Other SKMC facilities are aiming for JCI accreditation in the next few years.

In 2009, SKMC changed its logo to reflect the relationship between SKMC and Cleveland Clinic. Later that year, SKMC was awarded recognition as a Cycle III Chest Pain Center, the first outside the United States and only the 12th worldwide. Recently, SKMC received accreditation as a Cycle IV Chest Pain Center - one of only a handful of institutions globally to receive such an accolade.

Clinical service
SKMC’s comprehensive health care services cater to the needs and priorities of the Abu Dhabi community, ensuring not only optimal levels of patient care and satisfaction but also promoting general health and well-being through education and awareness.

Sheikh Khalifa Medical City consists of a 568-bed Acute Care Hospital, 14 specialized outpatient clinics and the Blood Bank, and is accredited by Joint Commission International (JCI). Additionally, SKMC manages a 125-bed Behavioral Sciences Pavilion and an Urgent Care Center located within the city of Abu Dhabi.

Departments of related medical specialties collaborate as unified institutes to offer patient-centered care.

Specialist care:
 Cardiac Sciences Institute
 Critical Care
 Emergency Medicine
 Medicine Institute
 Pathology and Laboratory Medicine
 Pediatric Institute
 Physical medicine and rehabilitation
 Radiology
 Surgery Institute

Accreditations
 SKMC is accredited as a Cycle IV Chest Pain Center by the Society of Chest Pain Centers (SCPC), an achievement bestowed to only a few hospitals in the world. SKMC is the first hospital outside the United States to attain this accreditation (in June 2009) for its cardiac and emergency services.
 The Surgical Pavilion, Medical Pavilion, 14 Outpatient Specialty Clinics and Abu Dhabi Blood Bank are all accredited by Joint Commission International (JCI), since April 11, 2008.

External links
Official website of SKMC. Note the alternate spelling of Sheikh as Shaikh

Hospital buildings completed in 2000
Hospitals in the United Arab Emirates
Hospitals established in 2000